Lakeside Estate is a former settlement in Benton County, Missouri, United States. Lakeside Estate was a resort community on the Osage River in southern Cole Township.

References

Former populated places in Benton County, Missouri
Ghost towns in Missouri